Nathaniel Jones (February 17, 1788 Tyringham, Berkshire County, Massachusetts – July 20, 1866 Newburgh, Orange County, New York) was an American banker and politician from New York. He served two terms in the U.S. House from 1837 to 1841.

Life
About 1807, he removed to Warwick, New York, and taught school there for several years. Among his pupils was William H. Seward.

Political career 
He was a member of the New York State Assembly (Orange Co.) in 1827 and 1828. Afterwards he engaged in banking.

He was elected as a Democrat to the 25th and 26th United States Congresses, holding office from March 4, 1837 to March 3, 1841.

Later career 
He was New York State Surveyor General from February 1842 to February 1845, and a Canal Commissioner from February 1845 to November 1, 1847, when he resigned.

He was Superintendent of Schools and Clerk of the Board of Education of Newburgh in 1851. He was a member of the New York State Senate (9th D.) in 1852 and 1853.

Death 
He died on July 20, 1866 in Newburgh, Orange County, New York.

References 

The New York Civil List compiled by Franklin Benjamin Hough (pages 37f, 42, 137, 142 and 284; Weed, Parsons and Co., 1858)
 Obit in NYT on July 31, 1866 (Stating he was Marshal of the Southern District, which is not confirmed by the US Marshal's website.)

1788 births
1866 deaths
Democratic Party members of the New York State Assembly
Democratic Party New York (state) state senators
New York State Engineers and Surveyors
American bankers
People from Tyringham, Massachusetts
Politicians from Newburgh, New York
Erie Canal Commissioners
People from Warwick, New York
Democratic Party members of the United States House of Representatives from New York (state)
19th-century American politicians
19th-century American businesspeople